The Criminal Law Amendment Act 1912, extended provisions of the 1824 Act to Scotland and Ireland and widened the scope of the original bill. The Amendment act is also known as the Criminal Law Amendment Act, 1912; and the Criminal Law Amendment Act, 1885.

Amendments 
The Bill introduced a number of new amendments including

 Any male could now be whipped in private as a punishment. The court would decide on the instrument used and how many strokes would be administered.
 The 'person in charge' of brothels was now liable to charges not just the 'occupier'
 Arresting any man who would aid or abbett a prostitute

Application of Act 
The act would not apply to criminal proceedings triggered before the act came into effect.

References 

Prostitution law in the United Kingdom
United Kingdom Acts of Parliament 1912